Nicholas John Kusznir is a British geophysicist. He is Emeritus Professor of Geophysics at the University of Liverpool.

Kusznir completed his BSc in Physics at Durham University in 1972; earning a PhD from the same institution in 1976. He has been awarded both the Bigsby Medal (1987) and Lyell Medal (2019) of the Geological Society of London.

His h-index, per Google Scholar, is 56.

References

Living people
British geophysicists
Academics of the University of Liverpool
Alumni of Hatfield College, Durham
Year of birth missing (living people)
Lyell Medal winners